The 2008 Castle Point Borough Council election took place on 1 May 2008 to elect members of Castle Point Borough Council in Essex, England. One third of the council was up for election and the Conservative party stayed in overall control of the council.

After the election, the composition of the council was
Conservative 25
Canvey Island Independent Party 15
Labour 1

Background
14 seats were contested at the election with no election in Canvey West ward, but with a by-election being held in Canvey South at the same time as the normal election in the ward, after the Canvey Island Independent Party councillor Natalie Derby had stepped down in March 2008 due to ill health. One councillor stood down at the election, Conservative Elizabeth Govier from St Georges ward.

Not counting the extra by-election in Canvey South, there were 13 candidates each from the Conservative and Labour parties, 5 from the Canvey Island Independent Party, 3 each from the British National Party and the Green party and 1 from the UK Independence Party.

Election result
The Conservatives remained in control of the council after winning the seats in Benfleet, Hadleigh and Thundersley, while the Canvey Island Independent Party won all 6 seats on Canvey Island. No other party won any seats at the election, with Labour finishing behind the British National Party in 2 wards and behind the UK Independence Party in 1 ward. Overall turnout at the election was 33.0%.

Ward results

References

Castle Point Borough Council elections
2008 English local elections
2000s in Essex